Newton is an unincorporated community in Grays Harbor County, in the U.S. state of Washington.

History
Newton was so named in 1906. A post office called 1908, and remained in operation until 1919.

References

Unincorporated communities in Grays Harbor County, Washington
Unincorporated communities in Washington (state)